Thakar Singh (26 March 1929 – 6 March 2005) was a spiritual teacher in the contemporary Sant Mat (Radha Soami) lineage of Sikh religious leaders.
 
Initiated by Kirpal Singh in 1965, he began work as a Satguru himself in 1976, following the death of Kirpal Singh. Thakar Singh distributed what he paraphrased from Kirpal Singh as, "a practical form of spirituality which is not connected to any particular religion, sect, or thought." 

While he was born into Sikhism, and wore the traditional Sikh garb all his life, he gave up its traditional outer practices soon after initiation and devoted himself wholly to the Sant Mat spiritual practices known as Surat Shabd Yoga and Naam.  Continuing Kirpal Singh's emphasis on the unity of all religions, Thakar Singh frequently referred to the Bible when addressing Westerners, the Adi Granth, Ramayana and other Indian scriptures in India, and the Qur'an when addressing Muslim people.  He gave thousands of talks in his 30 years as a Master, his message being one of transcendence of the material and devotion to God, the "unchangeable permanence behind all things".

Biography
The documentation on Thakar Singh's life is mainly limited to the few details he communicated about himself during his talks and public appearances. A biography composed of stories about the Master was collected by Wendy Heid in 1994, and it touches the central points from the perspective of the inner, spiritual aspirations. It has few points of contact with concrete people, places, or times. Thakar Singh corrected and edited this work, however, and it was subsequently reprinted in 2000 and again in 2005, so the facts presented are probably authentic. There are also some biographical materials made available by his organisation Know Thyself As Soul, International, although they have few details or specifics and again focus in the main on the inner life.

Period of discipleship
Thakar's daily routine during his period of discipleship is described in a talk he gave at the Bhandara (death anniversary) of Kirpal Singh on 21 August 2003:

Devotional work 
Thakar began to work in the capacity of a preacher, and to hold Satsang (spiritual gatherings) in his home and elsewhere. This was a logical continuation of the devotional music classes and study classes of the Adi Granth he had been giving privately for many years; the only difference was that instead of preaching against the physical master, he now explained the Guru Granth Sahib in the light of his inner experiences. Kirpal Singh visited Thakar's city by invitation and visited his home in this time frame (exact date and location in the Punjab unknown, but near to Amritsar):

Each Sunday on his day off, Thakar would travel from one town to another to give satsang. Sometimes he would visit as many as four towns in one day. He also increased his meditation time on work days to four, five, and then six hours. In 1970, Kirpal Singh issued an invitation to all of his initiates in the form of a circular letter inviting anyone who wanted to have special instruction on how to give satsang to come to Delhi and receive personal lessons. Thakar applied for a four-month leave of absence from his work and began this intensive meditation retreat in the presence of the master with four other aspirants. The retreat consisted of 12 to 14 hours of meditation daily as the main regimen. 

Thakar returned to work after four months and continued his practices. When Kirpal Singh died in 1974, Thakar applied for a long leave of absence and went into intensive meditation for up to 16 hours a day for an extended period. Afterwards he did not return to work but kept extending his leave, taking unpaid leave or making other arrangements until he retired early, at the age of 47.

Guruship
Kirpal Singh did not publicly name a successor, and after his death in 1974, a number of proposed successors appeared including Darshan Singh (Kirpal Singh's physical son), Ajaib Singh, Soami Divyanand, and others. Thakar Singh began work in the role of Guru at Sawan Asham in Delhi on 7 February 1976. Within four months he travelled to Germany and then later that year to Mexico. In 1979 he visited the United States for the first time. His first American representative was named Bernadine Chard. In 1987 he visited Canada.

Thakar Singh's mission grew steadily over time and he was responsible for a number of innovations and records. He was the first Sant Mat Master to visit Africa, making a five-month tour through the continent and visiting twelve countries, from October to February 1989. He also visited the Far East for the first time that year, going to South Korea, The Philippine Islands, Hong Kong, Thailand, and Taiwan during a three-month tour. He visited New Zealand on the same tour. Eventually he would reach all the continents with the exception of Antarctica and as many as forty countries. He moved his national headquarters to Nawan Nagar, near the foothills of Himalayas. In April 1992, Thakar Singh went into seclusion about 25 kilometres away in Sai. He did not travel for some years
except for brief visits, maintaining an intensive meditation schedule and very simple lifestyle. This regime continued for the rest of the Master's life. He visited the United States for the last time in the summer of 2003. At the end of his life he spoke of having initiated over two million souls.

Illness and death
Thakar Singh died on 6 March 2005 in Nawan Nagar, India, at the age of 76; however, he had been ill for the entire previous year when he underwent open heart surgery in February 2004.

Teachings
The documentation of the teachings of Thakar Singh is both extensive and multi-media in character, including books, circular letters, video, and audio tapes spanning almost 30 years.

Basic proposition of spirituality: we are souls, not bodies

 
Our chief enemy in this pursuit is our own mind, which does not allow our Soul to be in control, but instead usurps control over us:

One of the Master's most well known analogies for the control of the mind over the soul is that of the frog in the dirty drain:

Requirement of personal experience in spiritual matters
The Master often emphasised the essential requirement of personal experience in all things spiritual; not depending on others but finding reality for oneself:

Again,

Similarly, the main function of the experiences given to the disciple at the time of initiation is to convince the disciple there is something worth seeking inside—i.e., that the Master's instructions are worth pursuing. If something is provided initially, without any effort at all on the part of the disciple, a free sample as it were—then more will surely be available in the future with some efforts on the part of the meditator.

Soul is the prisoner of mind and matter
God is an essence and is subtle, matter is the opposite or negation of God. Mind is subtle matter, so both mind and matter are our enemies as soul. The purpose of life is to reunite with God, with whom we have been separated. Life is suffering due to this separation.

Purpose of human life
The human form has been especially created to serve this purpose as a vehicle for reuniting with the Lord; and it has no other function. It was earned by us after long lifespans in other forms. When a person suffers sickness or discomfort, those are reminders of our mortality. They are given only because we are not on the Way.

To find God, first we must acquire knowledge of who and what we are as soul, and then we will be able to find something greater. We are not bodies, but souls, and soul is of the same essence as God, i.e., soul is God, but on a smaller scale. The soul is entombed in layers of coverings, the chief of which are the body, mind, and intellect. These coverings are not alive; the soul is alive and provides the motive energy which is used to drive the coverings. We are so identified with these coverings, that we no longer have any idea we are souls and instead identify completely with the body and mind. 

God has not provided anything useless, and human beings are functionally complete as regards their given purpose, they need nothing extra such as worldly education or money:

The Master extends this even to food and drink, and tells stories sometimes of people who have subsisted on the inner food alone. He sometimes quotes Jesus who said, "Man does not live by bread alone, but by every word which comes forth from the mouth of God." According to the Master this reference has an esoteric meaning, and the Word which Jesus speaks of is the inner Sound Current.

Karma and the revolving powers
Regarding the other species of life, the Master follows the view expressed in Hinduism, namely that we are souls passing through a continuous process of phenomenological evolution, moving from one form to the next more complex form, gaining more and more complex consciousness and also more complex desires—until the soul is lucky enough to find itself incarnated as a human being. 

This state of consciousness such as experienced by a human being is the top most rung of a ladder which continues upwards; a qualitative change is required to go higher. However, the soul can also fall lower if the attention is directed to lower things, such as pets, carnal desires, or drug use. Generally it must suffer hells for missing this crucial chance.

Nature of suffering
Regarding suffering, the Master totally rejects the premise of life as requiring misery:

Life in this world is suffering; however, suffering is totally foreign to our natures and life is something we were meant only to live and enjoy. That enjoyment is not here, however, but with God:

Anyone who thinks this life can be made into something enjoyable is deluded. Mankind grasps at the momentary pleasures only because he knows of nothing better. He enjoys sexuality and then the result—a child and all the attendant problems and worries—arrives. All the enjoyments of this world are traps like this, which seem sweet on the outset but turn out to be tragic.

Regarding renunciation, it is not possible as a practical matter to live without action or live without desire. However, action can be transcended by devoting oneself entirely to a being who has himself become One and living by his instructions. Through the love of God in the form of a person who has become One with Him, we too can be One with Him. This person is the Guru. The Guru is the way out of suffering; he is like a lifeline leading to safety.

Functional role of the living master
God is not a silent spectator, watching the world impassively; He is fully conscious of the tormented situation in which his souls (which are really his own self) are suffering.

However, God does not directly intervene in the universe but makes use of agencies. If there is to be rain, it does not fall from a clear sky. First the clouds gather, then the rain comes out from them. If a child is to be born, the mother and father are provided. In the same way, everything in this world works through the function of some agency above and all the higher powers operate in this way, even God. God is One, but has deputed control over vast regions of the universe (both physical and spiritual) to agencies which handle the management. The situation is analogous to a King, who has both a prime minister and many generals managing various aspects of his kingdom. No one approaches the King directly, but all interact with him via his functionaries. In this way he continues to enjoy the total purity, bliss, and ecstasy which is his nature; while the world goes forward in myriad forms.

Thus if God is to interact with mankind, He has to come in the form of a man. There is no other means available for him to interact directly with us, as the functionaries are controlling the entire region we inhabit. The Saints and Masters (spiritual teachers) have been coming since human beings first came into existence. They have come in our own time; and they will continue to come as long as there are people who need to be awakened.

Key concept of the Sound Current: Shabd, Naam, or Word
Shabd, Naam, or Word is a form of God or a manifestation of God which human beings can experience, and contact with it has medicinal and practical benefits. The Word is not to be confused with the written words in the scriptures; the scriptures refer to the Word, but reading them does not comprise the experience of hearing it.

To hear the Sound Current, some specific actions have to be taken on the part of the Master. Functionally, the Soul is buried under the karmic impressions of millions if not billions of years of existence in this world. The Master Saint has the power to burn these impressions so that they are neutralised; after this, the Soul can experience the Sound Current. The appearance of the Sound is a function of purity; the more pure the vessel, the more easily the sound resounds inside it.

Thus the Sound Current is a gift which the Master can give to those whom he chooses, or perhaps to those he is destined to help. Some souls are specifically marked as belonging to the Master; however "the new applicants can also be accepted."

Love versus attachment
Love is the criterion for the life of a human being. God is Love and love is God and the way back to God is also through Love, as the Master is Love Personified and the Sound Current is also a conscious current of love. However, the only true form of love from the perspective of life lived in this world, is called devotion. All other forms of love are either debased through egotism or else a form of confusion and delusion, brought on at the level of mind.

The nature of romantic love as a form of suffering is relentlessly analysed:

Fundamentally, no one can love unless they are connected to God, as God is the source of Love and is sometimes described as Love itself. Our minds, on the other hand, are totally devoid of love:

All relationships fall away in what might be called the doctrine of individual responsibility:

Notes

References

External links 
 Thakar Singh Online Audio/Video/Text Library at www.thakar-singh.com
 Thakar Singh's Teachings in his own words at www.thakar-singh.org
 About Thakar Singh, by people who knew him personally at www.thakar-singh.net

1929 births
2005 deaths
Indian Hindu spiritual teachers
Radha Soami
Sant Mat gurus
20th-century Hindu religious leaders